Gospitomnik is a rural locality (a khutor) in Frunzenskoye Rural Settlement, Sredneakhtubinsky District, Volgograd Oblast, Russia. The population was 1,005 as of 2010. There are 20 streets.

Geography 
Gospitomnik is located north from Zapornoye Lake, east from Sudomoyka Erik, 18 km west of Srednyaya Akhtuba (the district's administrative centre) by road. Maslovo is the nearest rural locality.

References 

Rural localities in Sredneakhtubinsky District